The  occurred on 27 September 1977, in Yokohama, Japan. In the crash, a United States Marine Corps RF-4B-41-MC, BuNo 157344, c/n 3717, 'RF611', of VMFP-3, a (reconnaissance variant of the McDonnell Douglas F-4 Phantom II) flown by a United States Marine Corps crew based at nearby Naval Air Facility Atsugi, en route to USS Midway in Sagami Bay, suffered a mechanical malfunction, the port engine caught fire, and crashed into a residential neighborhood.  The crash killed two boys, ages 1 and 3, and injured seven others, several seriously. The two-man crew of the aircraft, Capt. J. E. Miller, of Mendota, Illinois, and 1st Lt. D. R. Durbin, of Natchitoches, Louisiana, ejected and were not seriously injured.

The crash, which occurred near present-day Eda Station, destroyed several houses. The two young boys initially survived the crash into their home, but died later from severe burns. The boys' mother, Kazue Doshida, was also severely burned. Due to the fear that she would be adversely affected during her recovery by the shock, she was not told until 29 January 1979, that her sons had died.  Upon hearing of their deaths, Doshida responded that she wanted to hold them one more time. Doshida died in 1982, aged 31, from complications related to her injuries.

Memorial 
In memorial to Doshida, a statue was erected in 1985 in a Yokohama park.  The statue depicts her holding her two sons.

See also
1959 Okinawa F-100 crash
 1960 Munich C-131 crash
1964 Machida F-8 crash
1988 Remscheid A-10 crash
 Cavalese cable car disaster (1998)

References

Accidents and incidents involving United States Navy and Marine Corps aircraft
Aviation accidents and incidents in 1977
Aviation accidents and incidents in Japan
United States Navy in the 20th century
United States military in Japan
Yokohama F-4 crash, 1977
Japan–United States relations
Yokohama
United States Marine Corps in the 20th century
September 1977 events in Asia